Ulrich Surau (born August 19, 1952) is a German former football player. He spent six seasons in the Bundesliga with Borussia Mönchengladbach and Rot-Weiss Essen.

Honours
 UEFA Cup winner: 1975.
 UEFA Cup finalist: 1973.
 Bundesliga champion: 1975, 1976.
 Bundesliga runner-up: 1974.
 DFB-Pokal winner: 1973.

External links
 

1952 births
Living people
German footballers
Bundesliga players
Alemannia Aachen players
Borussia Mönchengladbach players
Rot-Weiss Essen players
Bonner SC players
NEC Nijmegen players
UEFA Cup winning players
Association football midfielders
West German footballers
West German expatriate footballers
West German expatriate sportspeople in the Netherlands
Expatriate footballers in the Netherlands
People from Emmerich am Rhein
Sportspeople from Düsseldorf (region)
Footballers from North Rhine-Westphalia